Castanea delle Furie is a  of the  of Messina in the Province of Messina, Sicily, southern Italy. At the time of the Istat census of 2001 it had 2,103 inhabitants.

References

Frazioni of the Metropolitan City of Messina